Port of Liepaja is a port in Liepāja, Latvia.  It handled 7 334 261,80 tons of cargo and 39 987 passengers in 2019, making it the third largest port in the country (by territory, number of passengers and amount of cargo handled).

References

External links 

Port of Liepāja

Liepāja